Deborah Copenhaver Fellows (born 1948) is an American sculptor known for her Western themed works.  Her best known work is the life-sized statue of former Arizona senator Barry Goldwater included in the National Statuary Hall Collection in the U.S. Capitol in Washington D.C.  It was added to the collection as one of Arizona’s two statues in 2015.

Early life
Fellows was born and raised on a ranch in northern Idaho.  Her father Deb Copenhaver was a champion rodeo rider, winning two world championships in 1955 and 1956 and was inducted into the National Cowboy Hall of Fame in 1991 and the ProRodeo Hall of Fame in 1992. As a teenager Deborah Fellow was selected Miss Rodeo Washington.  During this time she developed a passion for horses that is frequently reflected in her sculpture.

She attended Fort Wright College of the Holy Names where she first began a serious study of sculpture.

Her statue of Bing Crosby was erected just outside the Crosby Student Center, on the Gonzaga University and dedicated on May 3, 1981, Crosby’s birthday.

Fellows won a competition to create the Washington Korean War Memorial, (hers was of a Korean War veteran) and it was dedicated on the Washington State Capitol grounds in Olympia, Washington , on July 24, 1993.

She was inducted into the National Sculpture Society in 2008 and the National Cowgirl Museum and Hall of Fame in 2009.

Selected works
 The Founder, aka Adolph Coors, Golden, Colorado, 1980
 Bing Crosby, Gonzaga University, Spokane, Washington, 1981
 Inland Northwest Vietnam Veterans Memorial, Dedicated November 10, 1985
 Montana Vietnam Veterans Memorial, Dedicated November 11, 1988
 Tribute to a Cowboy aka Benny Binion,  Las Vegas, Nevada, dedicated November 28, 1988
 Washington Korean War Memorial, Dedicated July 24, 1993
 Lady of the Sea, Cape Sante Marina, Anacortes, Washington 1994

References

1948 births
Living people
20th-century American sculptors
Artists from Montana
Sculptors from Arizona
Washington State University alumni
Heritage University alumni
20th-century American women artists
Cowgirl Hall of Fame inductees
National Sculpture Society members
21st-century American sculptors
21st-century American women artists
American women sculptors